Riistavesi is a former municipality in Finland. It was established in 1923 in Kuopio province. Riistavesi became a part of Kuopio in 1973. There were 2273 inhabitants in Riistavesi in 1970.

References

Former municipalities of Finland